Miriam Galanti (born 5 April 1989) is an Italian actress and television presenter.

Career 
Born in Mantua and grown up in Borgoforte, she graduated at Centro Sperimentale di Cinematografia in 2015 and began her acting career in Rome.

She won the Grey Goose's "An Acting Talent Beyond" Award for the Best Newcomer Actor at the 71st Venice International Film Festival. After few minor roles in television series such as Don Matteo and Che Dio ci aiuti, she starred as the lead in the 2018 thriller film Scarlett. For her role of the antagonist Sonia in the 2019 horror film In the Trap, she was awarded with the Kinéo Prize at the 76th Venice International Film Festival.

In 2020, she co-hosted with Dario Vergassola the documentary show Sei in un Paese meraviglioso on Sky Arte. In 2021, she was the narrator of the Sky documentary Dante: La visione nell'arte for the 700th anniversary of Dante Alighieri's death. She also hosted the 2021 Pesaro International Film Festival.

On 8 March 2022, she was among the nine testimonials of the International Women's Day campaign against violence against women at the Chamber of Deputies.

Personal life 
She has been in a relationship with actor and television personality Gilles Rocca since 2009.

Filmography

References

External links
 

1989 births
Living people
21st-century Italian actresses
Italian film actresses
Italian television actresses
Actors from Mantua
Centro Sperimentale di Cinematografia alumni